Panaon, officially the Municipality of Panaon, is a 5th class municipality in the province of Misamis Occidental, Philippines. According to the 2020 census, it has a population of 10,797 people.

Geography

Climate

Barangays
Panaon is politically subdivided into 16 barangays.
 Baga
 Bangko
 Camanucan
 Dela Paz
 Lutao
 Magsaysay
 Map-an
 Mohon
 Poblacion
 Punta
 Salimpuno
 San Andres
 San Juan
 San Roque
 Sumasap
 Villalin

Demographics

Economy

References

External links
 [ Philippine Standard Geographic Code]
Philippine Census Information
Local Governance Performance Management System

Municipalities of Misamis Occidental